Saxman is an unincorporated community in Rice County, Kansas, United States.  Located along Cow Creek just above its confluence with Jarvis Creek, it lies along local roads southeast of Lyons.

History
For millennia, the land now known as Kansas was inhabited by Native Americans.  In 1803, most of modern Kansas was secured by the United States as part of the Louisiana Purchase.  In 1854, the Kansas Territory was organized, then in 1861 Kansas became the 34th U.S. state.  In 1867, Rice County was founded.

A post office was opened in Saxman in 1891, and remained in operation until it was discontinued in 1952.

In May 2007, Saxman was severely affected by flooding from Cow Creek. The flooding washed away roads and farms and damaged many of the community's residences. Several of the community's residents were forced to evacuate.

Education
The community is served by Sterling USD 376 public school district.

See also
 National Register of Historic Places listings in Rice County, Kansas

References

Further reading

External links
 Rice County maps: Current, Historic - KDOT

Unincorporated communities in Kansas
Unincorporated communities in Rice County, Kansas